, also known as Movie International Company Ltd. (MIC), was a former Japanese animation production company known for the J9 Series. It was originally established in 1974 by Tsubota as Shigezu Ukuda founded as a video distribution company. It began producing animation in 1979. Enoki Films in the United States currently holds the American license to most of Kokusai Eiga's works. The company still exists today without producing anything else but the intellectual rights of its series.

TV series

 Josephina the Whale (1979) - produced with Ashi Productions
 Zukkoke Knight: Don De La Mancha (1980) - produced with Ashi Productions
 Space Warrior Baldios (1980-1981) - produced with Ashi Productions
 Monchhichi Twins (1980) - produced with Ashi Productions
 Mechakko Dotakon (1981)
 Wakakusa Monogatari Yori Wakakusa no Yon Shimai (1981) - produced with Toei Animation
 J9 series (1981-1984)
 Galactic Cyclone Braiger (1981-1982)
 Galactic Gale Baxingar  (1982-1983)
 Galactic Whirlwind Sasuraiger (1983-1984)
 Honey Honey no Suteki na Bouken (1981-1982) - produced with Toei Animation
 Makyou Densetsu Acrobunch (1982)
 Little Pollon (1982-1983)
 Mission Outer Space Srungle (1983-1984)
 Nanako SOS (1983)
 Chou Kousoku Galvion (1984) - produced with Studio Robin and Artmic
 Souya Monogatari (1984)
 Futari Daka (1984-1985)

Movies

 Space Warrior Baldios   (1981) - produced with Ashi Productions
 Ai no Kiseki: Doctor Norman Monogatari (1982) - produced with Toei Animation

1974 establishments in Japan
Mass media companies established in 1974
Japanese animation studios